The following lists events that happened during 1864 in New Zealand.

Incumbents

Regal and viceregal
Head of State — Queen Victoria
Governor — Sir George Grey

Government and law
The 3rd Parliament continues.

Speaker of the House — David Monro
Premier — Frederick Weld takes over from Frederick Whitaker on 24 November.
Minister of Finance — William Fitzherbert replaces Reader Wood who resigned on 24 November.
Chief Justice — Hon Sir George Arney

Events 
 11 February: Major Charles Heaphy is recommended for the Victoria Cross. It was not awarded until 1867.
 31 March – 2 April: Battle of Ōrākau
 11 June: The Timaru Herald publishes its first issue. The paper was initially weekly, but increased its frequency of publication to bi-weekly and then tri-weekly, and became a daily on 1 January 1878. It continues .
 Australian magpie introduced to New Zealand
Up to 6000 miners come to the Wakamarina Valley in Marlborough after gold is discovered. Canvastown is founded at the river mouth. About  of gold is recovered in 1864, but the surface gold is quickly exhausted.
The Wairau Record starts publishing in Blenheim. The newspaper changed its name to The Marlborough News and General Advertiser in 1865 and then to just The Marlborough News. It folded in 1874.
The Marlborough Times starts publishing in Blenheim. It folds after about six months.
 West Coast Gold Rush (1864)

Arts and literature

Music
The Dunedin Choral Society is formed.
The Lyster Opera Company makes its first tour to New Zealand (possibly the first by a full opera company).

Sport

Cricket
Gearge Parr's All-England Eleven plays at a cricket carnival in Dunedin against teams from Otago and Canterbury. They later play at Christchurch's Hagley Park. None of the matches qualified as first-class and the home sides were allowed to field up to 22 batsmen. Itinerary

Horse racing

Major race winner
New Zealand Derby winner: Opera

Shooting
Ballinger Belt: Lieutenant Morse (Nelson)

Births

 27 April: David Kennedy, Marist brother, astronomer.

Deaths

January–June
 6 January (at Bath, England): Robert Wynyard, colonial administrator (born 1802)
 17 February (at London, England): William Cautley, early settler and politician (born 1822)
 2 April: Hine-i-turama Ngatiki, woman of mana (born 1818)
 28 April: Tohi Te Ururangi, tribal leader and assessor
 27 May: Marmaduke Nixon, politician and soldier (born 1814)
 18 June:
Octavius Mathias, pioneering Anglican priest (born 1805)
George Rhodes, pastoralist (born 1816)
 21 June (Battle of Te Ranga):
Rawiri Puhirake, tribal leader
Henare Wiremu Taratoa, tribal missionary, teacher and war leader

July–December
 8 July: Charles de Thierry, adventurer who attempted to establish his own sovereign state in New Zealand in the years before British annexation (born 1793)
 13 September: Thomas McDonnell, Snr., Additional British Resident in New Zealand (born 1788)
 20 September: Aaron Buzacott, missionary on Rarotonga
 23 September (at South Yarra, Victoria): Robert Clark Morgan, missionary in the South Seas (born 1798)
 2 November: John McGlashan, lawyer, politician, public servant and educationalist (born 1802) 
 6 December: John Cuff, politician (born 1805)
 29 December: John Ryan, recipient of the Victoria Cross (born 1839)

Unknown date
 Hare Pomare, musician

See also
List of years in New Zealand
Timeline of New Zealand history
History of New Zealand
Military history of New Zealand
Timeline of the New Zealand environment
Timeline of New Zealand's links with Antarctica

References
General
 Romanos, J. (2001) New Zealand Sporting Records and Lists. Auckland: Hodder Moa Beckett. 
Specific

External links